Luka Lapornik (born 24 October 1988) is a Slovenian professional basketball player for Élan Chalon of the French Pro B. He is a 1.95 m (6 ft 5 in) tall swingman.

Slovenia national team 
Lapornik was called by coach Božidar Maljković to help the Slovenia national team prepare for the Eurobasket 2011 tournament. He played five friendly games, scoring 4 points. Again he was called to preparations before Eurobasket 2013. He played seven friendly games, scoring 10 points.

External links 
Zlatorog Laško Profile

1988 births
Living people
ABA League players
Élan Chalon players
Joventut Badalona players
KK Krka players
KK Zlatorog Laško players
KK Šentjur players
Liga ACB players
Shooting guards
Slovenian expatriate basketball people in Spain
Slovenian men's basketball players
Small forwards
Sportspeople from Celje